Prasinoxena metaleuca is a moth of the family Pyralidae first described by George Hampson in 1912. It is found in Thailand, western Malaysia and Sri Lanka.

The caterpillars are known to feed on Acacia mangium, Lansium domesticum and other Lansium species.

References

Moths of Asia
Moths described in 1912
Pyralidae